Skystar or SkyStar may refer to:
Skyfly S-34 Skystar, a Swiss ultralight aircraft
Skystar 300, an Israeli surveillance blimp
SkyStar Movies, is a Bollywood based movies channel
SkyStar Aircraft, a defunct American aircraft manufacturer that operated between 1992 and 2005
SkyStar Airways, a Thai airline
SkyStar Wheel, a mobile Ferris wheel currently in San Francisco, California